William John Moore (2 August 1895 – 17 August 1932), sometimes known as Pal Moore, was an Ireland international footballer. He spent several years with Glentoran (in two separate spells), and also appeared in the Irish League with Ards. Away from Ireland, he made 117 appearances for Falkirk in the Scottish League First Division and played 33 games in the English Football League for Lincoln City. He played as an outside left. He played for the Ireland national team against Scotland in 1923, and appeared in a Victory International, also against Scotland, in 1919.

References

1895 births
1932 deaths
People from Ballyclare
Irish association footballers (before 1923)
Pre-1950 IFA international footballers
Association football wingers
Brantwood F.C. players
Glentoran F.C. players
Falkirk F.C. players
Lincoln City F.C. players
Ards F.C. players
NIFL Premiership players
Scottish Football League players
English Football League players
Ireland (IFA) wartime international footballers